GISCorps, founded in 2003, is a program initiated by the Urban and Regional Information Systems Association (URISA) that offers volunteer GIS services to under-served developing communities worldwide.

This volunteer based organization is headed by a team of professionals trained in urban and regional development. GISCorps has approximately 1,000 volunteers located in five continents and prepared to work on both domestic and international projects.  Their services are used for supplementing humanitarian relief, enhancing environmental analysis and fostering economic as well as community development.  They promote the use of information technology for more accurate and efficient means of illustrating and improving the civic infrastructure of a region.

Projects 
GISCorps has assisted in the following projects:
 Filtering Data for Hurricane Matthew in 2016 
 Data Collection in Burundi 
 Mission with World Food Programme in North Korea during 2016
 Geocoding Locations in Niger
COVID-19 Testing and Vaccination Sites Data Creation Project
This project was launched in collaboration with Coders Against COVID, and recognized as the FEMA App of the Week in a bulletin issued by the federal agency on April 24, 2020.

See also 
 Earthwatch Institute – United States
 SpatialLink.org – Linking Spatial Professionals and Volunteers Through Search, Profile, News, Blog, Forum, Map, Chat, WIKI, WAP and Other GIS Tools
 The Society for Conservation GIS

References

External links 
 GISCorps
 URISA

Non-profit organizations based in the United States
Non-profit technology
Geographic information systems organizations